The Mixed duet technical routine competition of the 2022 European Aquatics Championships was held on 15 August 2022.

Results
The event was held on 15 August at 11:00.

References

Artistic